Jeff Soto (born June 3, 1975) is an American contemporary artist. His distinct color palette, subject matter and technique have been said to bridge the gap between Pop Surrealism and Street Art.

Early life
Soto was born in Fullerton, California, the eldest of four brothers. His father, Jeffrey worked as an offset printer and was an outdoor enthusiast and taxidermist. His mother, Patricia was a homemaker. Soto grew up in a middle class household where creativity was encouraged. He developed an interest in animals and plants due to his parents’ various outdoor activities- gardening, fishing, falconry and camping. From an early age Soto showed an interest in drawing, painting, and storytelling. As a high school student, Soto began to experiment with various genres and art techniques including painting, photography, ceramics, and filmography. In 1992 and 1993 he was a California Arts Scholar and attended the California State Summer School for the Arts held at CalArts in Valencia. He graduated from Norte Vista High School in 1993.

Education
Soto attended Riverside City College from 1993 to 1999, and earned an associate degree in Arts. While at RCC, Soto experimented further with art, including works in sculpture, public artworks (graffiti and stenciling), abstract painting, and computer design.

In 1999 Soto transferred to Art Center College of Design in Pasadena where he majored in Illustration and minored in Fine Art. That same year, Soto, disillusioned and bored with the state of graffiti art in the late 1990s, took what ended up being a decade long hiatus. He focused instead on both showing his work in local galleries and developing his illustration career. During these years, Soto was inspired by several of his Art Center instructors who were working as successful illustrators as well as showing the same work in galleries. Soto had his first solo exhibit during his last year in college. Potato Stamp Dreams opened at New Image Art Gallery in Los Angeles a few days after the September 11th terrorist attacks. As a student in 2002 Soto began to work in the field of illustration, with work appearing in American Illustration and Communication Arts. Soto graduated with Distinction from Art Center College of Design in April 2002.

Influences
Soto received his first skateboard as a gift at the age of 9. It was an early introduction to skateboard graphics which were a significant influence. Early on, horror, science fiction, and fantasy movies and television were another influence, in particular Star Wars, Robotech, and Mtv. In college, Soto discovered and was inspired by artists such as Max Ernst, Frida Kahlo, Andy Warhol, Amedeo Modigliani, Van Gogh and Paul Cadmus. More recent influences include Soto's contemporaries- Dave Cooper, David Choe, Mario “Mars1” Martinez, the Clayton Brothers and Camille Rose Garcia.

Work

Graffiti
In 1989 Soto found a book while looking through the Riverside Downtown Library's art section called Street Art. The book showcased early illegal art in New York as well as hip hop based subway graffiti of the 1970s. Inspired by this book, he began stenciling his “Sotofish” design on walls and signs. The following year he and a friend created a graffiti crew called CIA (Criminally Insane Artists) which attracted several other writers from their high school.

Soto adapted the moniker of “KILO”, "TREK" as well as “Sotofish” and started to tag, bomb and piece. In 1991 he met the artist Maxx242 and they began painting together. In 1995 they formed Bashers Crew which included members from Riverside, Los Angeles and Long Beach.

In 1999 Soto took a break from all aerosol painting, citing health reasons, boredom with the limitations of the spray can and conflict among graffiti writers. Ten years later in London, Soto visited artists D*Face and Word To Mother. Seeing their work in person inspired Soto to begin painting on walls again. Since then, Soto has reconnected with his graffiti roots and painted murals in New York, Los Angeles, Tokyo, Miami, London and Paris. In 2010 he participated in the Underbelly Project, an illegal art gallery beneath the city of New York. In 2011 he completed his largest wall painting to date- "Les Chat Terrible" in Lyon, France. Soto claims he is not a graffiti writer or street artist, rather he calls himself “a muralist with an occasional urge to do some graf”.

Illustration
In 2002, Soto began working as a freelance illustrator specializing in editorial work. Some of his clients include Entertainment Weekly, Sony Music, Rockstar Games, Saatchi & Saatchi, United Airlines and Disney. His work has adorned magazines, books, albums, and advertisements. Soto created illustrations to be the album art of releases by two post-hardcore bands; Finch's Say Hello To Sunshine in 2005 and Halifax's The Inevitability of a Strange World in 2006. In 2010, Soto began creating gig posters for various bands including Pearl Jam, The Black Keys and Soundgarden.

Fine Art
In 2002, Soto had his first solo exhibit at New Image Art Gallery in Los Angeles. Months later he showed at La Luz de Jesus in Los Angeles. These shows were well received and soon after he was invited to group and solo exhibits throughout the United States. With roots in graffiti as well as traditional painting, Soto continues to show in galleries which feature "Street Art" and also those which show "Pop Surrealism". He has been called a "crossover" artist for his relevance in both genres. In 2008 Soto had a solo exhibit at the Riverside Art Museum. His art has been chronicled in Potato Stamp Dreams (2005) and Storm Clouds (2009) both published by Murphy Books. He is represented in the United States by Jonathan LeVine Gallery in New York City. His paintings have been exhibited throughout the world including museums, galleries and walls in New York, Paris, Tokyo and London.

List of solo exhibits

2018 "Futuregods", Lancaster Museum of Art, Lancaster, CA

2016 "Graffiti", Bunsen Goetz Galerie, Nuremberg, Germany

2016 "The Sotofish Society", Jonathan LeVine Gallery, New York, NY

2015 "Nightgardens", Merry Karnowsky Gallery, Los Angeles, CA

2013 "Fire Within", two person show with Maxx242. Bunsen Goetz Galerie, Nuremberg, Germany

2012 "Decay and Overgrowth", Jonathan LeVine Gallery, New York, NY

2010 "Lifecycle", Jonathan Levine Gallery, New York, NY

2009 "The Inland Empire", Stolenspace, London

2008 "Turning in Circles", Riverside Art Museum, Riverside, CA

2007 "Storm Clouds", Jonathan Levine Gallery, New York, NY

2006 "Cold Ice Age", BLK/MRKT Gallery, Culver City, CA

2006 "Supernova", Jonathan LeVine Gallery, New York, NY

2004 "Jeff Soto", BLKMRKT Gallery, Culver City, CA

2003 "Complete Domination", OX-OP Gallery. Minneapolis, MN

2001 "Potato Stamp Dreams", New Image Art, Los Angeles, CA

Personal life
Soto lives and works in Riverside, California with his wife Jennifer and their two daughters. In 2016 he became a full-time Professor at Riverside City College where he teaches studio art classes.

External links
 Soto's website
 Official Facebook
 Official Twitter
 Soto's Blog
 Jonathan LeVine Gallery
 Subvert Magazine Interview

Painters from California
20th-century American painters
American male painters
21st-century American painters
21st-century American male artists
American graffiti artists
American installation artists
1975 births
Artists from Riverside, California
People from Fullerton, California
Living people
Riverside City College alumni
American contemporary painters
20th-century American male artists